Guru is a 2003 Indian Bengali-language film directed by Swapan Saha, starring Mithun Chakraborty, Tapas Paul, Subhendu Chattopadhyay and Jisshu Sengupta. The film is the remake of Tamil film Baashha (1995).

Plot 

Guru is a crime subject where Mithun plays the avenger.

Cast 
Mithun Chakraborty as Raja/Guru
Tapas Paul as Iqbal (cameo), Raja's best friend
Jisshu Sengupta as Jeet, Police Officer
Rachana Banerjee as Rinky
Subhendu Chattopadhyay as Shyam Babu
Kalyani Mondal
Laboni Sarkar as OC Rina Roy
Kaushik Banerjee as a corrupt politician and Don Kedar Nath, the leader of terrorism
Locket Chatterjee as Mou
Sandhita Chatterjee
Dulal Lahiri as Rinky's father
Sumit Ganguly
Kharaj Mukherjee as Raja's assistant

Soundtrack

Reception
The film had a successful outing in Bengal.

References

External links 
 

2003 films
2000s Bengali-language films
2000s Hindi-language films
Mithun's Dream Factory films
Bengali-language Indian films
Films shot in Ooty
Indian gangster films
Films about organised crime in India
Films scored by Babul Bose
Indian crime drama films
Indian action thriller films
Bengali remakes of Hindi films
Bengali remakes of Tamil films
2003 action thriller films
2003 crime drama films